Jack Erwin Russell (October 24, 1905 – November 3, 1990) was a Major League Baseball player from 1926 to 1940 for the Boston Red Sox, Chicago Cubs, Cleveland Indians, Washington Senators, Detroit Tigers and St. Louis Cardinals.  Russell was mainly a pitcher and his career marks were 85 wins, 141 losses, and a 4.46 ERA.  After his baseball career ended, Russell settled in Clearwater, Florida and was instrumental in raising money to build a baseball stadium, Jack Russell Memorial Stadium, which became the spring training home of the Philadelphia Phillies beginning in 1955 and continuing through 2003, when the team moved to Bright House Networks Field, also in Clearwater.

Russell died November 3, 1990, in Clearwater, Florida.

See also
 List of Major League Baseball annual saves leaders

References

External links

1905 births
1990 deaths
Chicago Cubs players
American League All-Stars
Boston Red Sox players
Cleveland Indians players
Washington Senators (1901–1960) players
Detroit Tigers players
St. Louis Cardinals players
Major League Baseball pitchers
People from Paris, Texas
Baseball players from Texas